Guy Goosen (born 12 July 1959) is a Zimbabwean butterfly and freestyle swimmer. He competed in three events at the 1980 Summer Olympics.

References

External links
 

1959 births
Living people
Zimbabwean male butterfly swimmers
Zimbabwean male freestyle swimmers
Olympic swimmers of Zimbabwe
Swimmers at the 1980 Summer Olympics
Place of birth missing (living people)